Giancarlo Pantano (born 15 June 1977 in Rome) is an Italian footballer. He plays as a midfielder. He is currently unattached.

External links
 Giancarlo Pantano's profile on Cisco Roma's official website

1977 births
Living people
Footballers from Rome
Italian footballers
U.S. Pistoiese 1921 players
A.S. Gualdo Casacastalda players
Association football midfielders